Nigel O'Loughlin (born 19 January 1954) is an English former professional footballer who played as a midfielder.

External links
Clarke Chroniclers

1954 births
Living people
English footballers
Rhyl F.C. players
Rochdale A.F.C. players
Shrewsbury Town F.C. players
Ashton United F.C. players
English Football League players
Association football midfielders